Nour Abbès (born 20 June 1993) is a Tunisian former tennis player.

In her career, Abbès won one doubles title on the ITF Circuit. On 1 November 2010, she reached her best singles ranking of world No. 887. On 11 June 2012, she peaked at No. 823 in the doubles rankings.

Playing for Tunisia Fed Cup team, Abbès has a win–loss record of 16–5.

ITF finals

Doubles (1–1)

References

External links
 
 
 

1993 births
Living people
Tunisian female tennis players
Sportspeople from Tunis
African Games gold medalists for Tunisia
African Games medalists in tennis
African Games silver medalists for Tunisia
African Games bronze medalists for Tunisia
Mediterranean Games medalists in tennis
Mediterranean Games bronze medalists for Tunisia
Competitors at the 2011 All-Africa Games
Competitors at the 2013 Mediterranean Games
21st-century Tunisian women